American bailout may refer to:
Emergency Economic Stabilization Act of 2008
Troubled Asset Relief Program
Automotive industry crisis of 2008–2010

See also
American Recovery and Reinvestment Act of 2009